Chester Charles Bennington (March 20, 1976 – July 20, 2017) was an American singer and songwriter who was best known as the lead vocalist of rock band Linkin Park. He was also the lead vocalist of the bands Grey Daze, Dead by Sunrise, and Stone Temple Pilots.

Bennington first gained prominence as a vocalist following the release of Linkin Park's debut album, Hybrid Theory (2000), which was a worldwide commercial success. The album was certified Diamond by the Recording Industry Association of America in 2005, making it the bestselling debut album of the decade, as well as one of the few albums ever to achieve that many sales. Linkin Park's following studio albums, from Meteora (2003) to One More Light (2017), continued the band's success.

Bennington formed his own band, Dead by Sunrise, as a side project in 2005. The band's debut album, Out of Ashes, was released on October 13, 2009. He became the lead singer of Stone Temple Pilots in 2013 to release the extended play record High Rise on October 8, 2013, via their own record label, Play Pen, but left in 2015 to focus solely on Linkin Park. As an actor, he appeared in films such as Crank (2006), Crank: High Voltage (2009), and Saw 3D (2010).

Bennington struggled with depression and substance abuse for most of his life, starting in his childhood. On July 20, 2017, he was found dead at his home in Palos Verdes Estates, California; the coroner concluded that he had died as a result of suicide by hanging. Hit Parader magazine placed Bennington at number 46 on their list of the "Top 100 Metal Vocalists of All Time". Bennington has been credited by several publications as one of the greatest rock vocalists of his generation. Writing for Billboard, Dan Weiss stated that Bennington "turned nu-metal universal".

Early life
Chester Charles Bennington was born on March 20, 1976, in Phoenix, Arizona. His mother was a nurse, while his father was a police detective who worked on child sexual abuse cases. Bennington took an interest in music at a young age, citing the bands Depeche Mode and Stone Temple Pilots as his earliest inspirations, and dreamed of becoming a member of Stone Temple Pilots, which he later achieved when he became their lead singer. Bennington was a victim of sexual abuse from an older male friend when he was seven years old. He was afraid to ask for help because he did not want people to think he was gay or lying, and the abuse continued until he was 13 years old. Years later, he revealed the abuser's identity to his father, but chose not to press charges.

Bennington's parents divorced when he was 11 years old. The abuse and his situation at home affected him so much that he felt the urge to "kill everybody and run away". To comfort himself, he drew pictures and wrote poetry and songs. After the divorce, Bennington's father gained custody of him. Bennington started abusing alcohol, marijuana, opium, cocaine, meth, and LSD. He was physically bullied in high school. In an interview, he said that he was "knocked around like a rag doll at school, for being skinny and looking different". At the age of 17, Bennington moved in with his mother. He was banned from leaving the house for a time when his mother discovered his drug activity. He worked at a Burger King branch before starting his career as a professional musician.

Career

Early acts
Bennington first began singing with a band called Sean Dowdell and His Friends?, and together they released an eponymous three-track cassette in 1993. Later, Dowdell and Bennington moved on to form a new band, Grey Daze, a post-grunge band from Phoenix, Arizona. The band recorded a demo in 1993 and two albums: Wake Me in 1994, and ...No Sun Today in 1997. Bennington left Grey Daze in 1998.

Linkin Park

Bennington had been frustrated and nearly quit his musical career altogether when Jeff Blue, the vice president of artists and repertoire at Zomba Music in Los Angeles, offered him an audition with the future members of Linkin Park (then 'Xero'). Bennington quit his day job at a digital services firm and traveled to California for the audition, in which he successfully won a place in the band. He left his own birthday party early to record his audition.

Bennington and Mike Shinoda, the band's other vocalist, made significant progress together, but failed to find a record deal. After the band had faced numerous rejections, Blue, now a vice president of artists and repertoire at Warner Bros. Records, intervened again to help the band sign with Warner.

On October 24, 2000, Linkin Park released their debut album, Hybrid Theory, through Warner Bros. Records. Bennington and Shinoda wrote the lyrics to Hybrid Theory based on some early material. Shinoda characterized the lyrics as interpretations of universal feelings, emotions, and experiences, and as "everyday emotions you talk about and think about." Bennington later described the songwriting experience to Rolling Stone magazine in early 2002, "It's easy to fall into that thing – 'poor, poor me', that's where songs like 'Crawling' come from: I can't take myself. But that song is about taking responsibility for your actions. I don't say 'you' at any point. It's about how I'm the reason that I feel this way. There's something inside me that pulls me down."

Bennington primarily served as Linkin Park's lead vocalist, but he occasionally shared the role with Shinoda. All Music Guide described Bennington's vocals as "higher-pitched" and "emotional", in contrast to Shinoda's hip-hop-style delivery. Both members also worked together to write lyrics for the band's songs.

Hybrid Theory (2000) was certified diamond by the RIAA in 2005. The band's second album, Meteora (2003), reached number one on the Billboard 200 album chart, as did its third album, Minutes to Midnight (2007). Linkin Park has sold more than 100 million albums worldwide. The band has won two Grammy Awards, six American Music Awards, four MTV Video Music Awards and three World Music Awards. In 2003, MTV2 named Linkin Park the sixth-greatest band of the music video era and the third-best of the new millennium. Billboard ranked Linkin Park No. 19 on the Best Artists of the Decade chart. In 2012, the band was voted as the greatest artist of the 2000s in a Bracket Madness poll on VH1.

Dead by Sunrise

In 2005, Bennington co-founded Dead by Sunrise, an electronic rock band from Los Angeles, California, with Orgy and Julien-K members Amir Derakh and Ryan Shuck. Dead by Sunrise made their live debut in May 2008, performing at the 13th anniversary party for Club Tattoo in Tempe, Arizona.

The band released their debut album, Out of Ashes, on October 13, 2009.

Stone Temple Pilots

In February 2013, Stone Temple Pilots parted ways with long-time lead singer Scott Weiland. The band recruited Bennington to replace Weiland in May 2013. On May 18, 2013, Bennington took the stage at KROQ's Weenie Roast with the band. The setlist included original Stone Temple Pilots songs, as well as their first single with Bennington on vocals called "Out of Time", which debuted on May 19 and was available for free download via their official website. It was later announced by Bennington and the band in an exclusive KROQ interview that he was officially the new frontman of Stone Temple Pilots and discussed the possibility of a new album and tour. The song "Out of Time" is featured on their EP High Rise, which was released on October 8, 2013.

Bennington reflected on joining Stone Temple Pilots, stating, "Every band has its own kind of vibe. Stone Temple Pilots has this sexier, more classic rock feel to it. Linkin Park is a very modern, very tech-heavy type of band. I grew up listening to these guys. When this opportunity came up, it was just like a no-brainer." Bennington stated in interviews that singing lead vocals in Stone Temple Pilots was his lifelong dream. He left the band on good terms due to his commitments with Linkin Park in 2015 and was replaced two years later by Jeff Gutt.

Other works
In 2005, Bennington appeared on "Walking Dead", the lead single from turntablist Z-Trip's debut album Shifting Gears. Bennington also made a surprise guest appearance during Z-Trip's performance at the Coachella Valley Music and Arts Festival in 2005. Bennington re-recorded the Mötley Crüe song "Home Sweet Home" as a duet with the band as a charity single for the victims of Hurricane Katrina in the fall of 2005. He also joined Alice in Chains and performed the song "Man in the Box" at KROQ's Inland Invasion Festival in 2006. Bennington performed with Kings of Chaos during their six-show 2016 concert tour.

Bennington recorded a track for Slash's 2010 eponymous debut solo album entitled "Crazy" but it was blocked from release. Slash rerecorded it with Lemmy on vocals and the retitled "Doctor Alibi" was added instead. In May 2021, a snippet of the original Bennington track was finally released.

Personal life

Family and views
Bennington had a son, Jaime (born May 12, 1996), from his relationship with Elka Brand. In 2006, he adopted Brand's other son, Isaiah (born November 8, 1997). He married his first wife, Samantha Marie Olit, on October 31, 1996. They had one child together, Draven Sebastian (born April 19, 2002). Bennington's relationship with his first wife declined during his early years with Linkin Park, and they divorced in 2005.

In 2006, he married Talinda Ann Bentley, a former Playboy model with whom he had three children: Tyler Lee Bennington (born March 16, 2006) and twins Lily and Lila (born November 9, 2011). Chester and Talinda Bennington were harassed by a cyberstalker, who was later found guilty in 2008 of tampering with the couple's email and other personal information, as well as sending threatening messages, and was sentenced to two years in prison.

Bennington was a tattoo enthusiast. He had done work and promotions with Club Tattoo, a tattoo parlor in Tempe, Arizona. Club Tattoo is owned by Sean Dowdell, Bennington's friend since high school with whom he played in two bands.

Bennington was a fan of the Phoenix Suns, Arizona Cardinals, Arizona Diamondbacks, and Arizona Coyotes.

In a January 2011 interview, in response to the 2011 Tucson shooting, Bennington said, "There's a non-violent way to express yourself and get your point across – regardless of what you're saying or what your point is. In a free society, people have a right to believe whatever they want to believe. That's their business and they can speak their mind. But nobody, even in a free society, has the right to take another person's life. Ever. That's something that we really need to move beyond."

Bennington was a critic of U.S. president Donald Trump. On January 29, 2017, he tweeted that Trump was "worse than terrorism". This tweet resurfaced in July 2020 after Linkin Park sent Trump a cease and desist order for using "In the End" in an ad for his re-election campaign that year.

Health and injuries
Bennington was plagued with poor health during the making of Meteora, and struggled to attend some of the album's recording sessions. In the summer of 2003, he began to suffer from extreme abdominal pain and gastrointestinal issues while filming the music video for "Numb" in Prague. He was forced to return to the United States for surgery, and filmed the remainder of the music video in Los Angeles.

Bennington sustained a wrist injury in October 2007 while attempting to jump off a platform during a show in Melbourne at the Rod Laver Arena. Despite the injury, he continued to perform the entire show with a broken wrist, before heading to an emergency room, where he received five stitches.

In 2011, Bennington fell ill again, and Linkin Park was forced to cancel three shows and reschedule two from the A Thousand Suns World Tour. He injured his shoulder during the band's tour in Asia and was advised by doctors to have immediate surgery, canceling their final show at Pensacola Beach, Florida, and ending their tour.

Bennington struggled with depression and substance abuse. He overcame his drug addiction and would go on to denounce drug use in future interviews. He later battled with alcoholism during his tenure with Linkin Park, which he overcame following an intervention from his bandmates. In 2011, he said he had quit drinking, noting: "I just don't want to be that person anymore."

Bennington injured his ankle in January 2015 during a basketball game. He attempted to cope with the injury and perform with the aid of crutches and a knee scooter. Linkin Park later canceled the remainder of their tour to allow Bennington to undergo surgery and recover.

Relationship with Chris Cornell
Bennington was a close friend of Chris Cornell. They became friends during a tour they shared in the mid-2000s. The chemistry between the two had strengthened during the 2007–2008 Projekt Revolution Tour when Bennington joined Cornell on stage to sing Temple of the Dog's "Hunger Strike", and then Cornell joined Linkin Park to sing "Crawling". He was also the godfather of Cornell's son Christopher.

Bennington had commented on Cornell's death on Instagram, stating that he could not imagine a world without Cornell in it. Shinoda noted that Bennington was very emotional when the band performed "One More Light" in Cornell's honor on Jimmy Kimmel Live!, and Bennington could not finish singing the song during rehearsal because he started getting choked up. The band was due to record a live performance of their single "Heavy" on the show, but Bennington decided instead to play "One More Light" after hearing the news about Cornell's death, since the song is about the loss of a friend.

On May 26, 2017, a week after his Kimmel performance, Bennington sang Leonard Cohen's song "Hallelujah" at Cornell's funeral in Los Angeles.

Death

Bennington died on July 20, 2017 at his home in Palos Verdes Estates, California. The coroner ruled that he had died by suicide by hanging.

Bennington's death occurred on what would have been Chris Cornell's 53rd birthday. Cornell's death was also ruled as suicide two months earlier. After Bennington's death, Linkin Park canceled the rest of their One More Light Tour and refunded tickets.

Bennington's funeral was held on July 29 at South Coast Botanic Garden in Palos Verdes, California. In addition to his family members and close friends, many musicians who toured or played with Linkin Park also attended. The service also included a full stage for musical tributes.

Remembrances and tributes
Bennington filmed an episode of Carpool Karaoke: The Series six days before his death. Bennington's family allowed the episode to be aired on October 12, 2017. On August 27, during the 2017 MTV Video Music Awards ceremony, Jared Leto received media attention for his tribute to Bennington and Chris Cornell. Some of his former bandmates from Dead by Sunrise and Grey Daze united to perform a tribute for Bennington during a concert on September 2 in Las Vegas. Linkin Park also hosted a public tribute for Bennington in Los Angeles on October 27, titled Linkin Park and Friends: Celebrate Life in Honor of Chester Bennington. The event featured the band's first performance following his death, along with performances from Blink-182, members of System of a Down, Korn, Avenged Sevenfold, Bring Me the Horizon, Sum 41, Yellowcard, and the singer Kiiara, among others.

Rapper Jay-Z paid tribute to Bennington on several occasions by performing "Numb/Encore" live. Jay-Z and Bennington (with Linkin Park) collaborated on the song. Coldplay's Chris Martin paid tribute to Bennington during the band's North American tour concert at MetLife Stadium, playing an acoustic version of "Crawling" on piano. Several other artists, including Muse, Ryan Key (lead vocalist and guitarist of Yellowcard), rapper Machine Gun Kelly, Imagine Dragons, Billy Talent and Godsmack, also either covered Linkin Park songs (usually "Crawling") or played their own songs during concerts as tribute to Bennington in the days and months following his death. During the 60th Annual Grammy Awards's annual in memoriam tribute, rapper Logic performed the song "1-800-273-8255" live alongside Alessia Cara and Khalid as a tribute to both Cornell and Bennington. The song's title is the phone number of the National Suicide Prevention Lifeline.

Producer Markus Schulz made a trance remix of the Linkin Park song "In the End" as tribute to Bennington after his death which he debuted at Tomorrowland.

Bennington and other late musicians were honored in the music video for "Hold on to Memories" by Disturbed.

Following Bennington's death, singer Fred Durst said that Bennington "had a way of making anyone he spoke to feel heard, understood and significant. His aura and spirit were contagious and empowering. Often those types of people have so much pain and torture inside that the last thing they want is to contaminate or break the spirit of others... As real and transparent as our conversations would be, he was always the one projecting light on the shadows".

Aftermath
Linkin Park entered a hiatus following Bennington's death. Mike Shinoda stated in April 2022 that the band has no plans of recording a new album or touring.

Artistry

Voice
Bennington possessed a three-octave tenor vocal range, beginning at the lowest note of G 2, and reaching its peak at the highest note of G 5. His vocals showed tremendous durability for the entirety of his career. Althea Legaspi of Rolling Stone wrote: "Bennington's voice embodied the anguish and wide-ranging emotions of the lyrics, from capturing life's vulnerable moments to the fury and catharsis found in his belted screams, which he would often move between at the turn of a dime."

Musical style and influences
Bennington stated that he was influenced by Stone Temple Pilots, Alice in Chains, Arcade Fire, Circle Jerks, Descendents, Deftones, Jane's Addiction, Metallica, Fugazi, Refused, Ministry, Minor Threat, Misfits, The Naked and Famous, Nine Inch Nails, Nirvana, Pearl Jam, Skinny Puppy, Soundgarden, and A Tribe Called Quest. Bennington also considered himself as "a huge Madonna fan", crediting her for making him grow up wanting to be a musician.

Legacy
Several publications have commented on the musical legacy Bennington left behind. While describing the success of Bennington and Linkin Park, Allmusic's Andrew Leahey said, "Although rooted in alternative metal, Linkin Park became one of the most successful acts of the 2000s by welcoming elements of hip-hop, modern rock, and atmospheric electronica into their music ...focusing as much on the vocal interplay between singer Chester Bennington and rapper Mike Shinoda". Writing for Billboard, Dan Weiss stated that Bennington "turned nu-metal universal," as he was "clearly an important conduit for his far-ranging audience".

Fred Durst, lead singer of Limp Bizkit, stated that if it were not for Bennington's voice and his words, nu metal "would never have reached the masses and affected so many lives."

The New York Times Jon Caramanica commented that Bennington's ability to "pair serrated rawness with sleek melody" separated him from other contemporary singers, and also from the artists he was influenced by. Caramanica noted, "He was an emo sympathizer in a time when heavy metal was still setting the agenda for mainstream hard rock, and a hip-hop enthusiast who found ways to make hip-hop-informed music that benefited from his very un-hip-hop skill set". As Bennington acquired influences from industrial and hardcore punk acts, the journalist believed this was the factor that made Linkin Park survive the "rise and precipitous fall of the rap-rock era", calling the musician "a rock music polymath". Mikael Wood of the Los Angeles Times argued, "Perhaps more than Linkin Park's influential sound, Bennington's real artistic legacy will be the message he put across – the reassurance he offered from the dark".

BBC's Steve Holden called Bennington the "voice of a generation", saying his voice was arguably Linkin Park's greatest asset. Jonathan McAloon of The Daily Telegraph commented, "Bennington’s death will have an impact on many millennials because his voice was the sound of their millennium". While talking about Linkin Park's popularity, Corey Apar, of AllMusic, commented, "Bennington's oft-tortured vocals became one of the most distinctive in the alternative rock scene". Writing for The Guardian, Ben Beaumont-Thomas noted "Bennington’s decision to sing clearly and openly was, therefore, more radical than he is given credit for, and indeed more socially valuable". The journalist continued to discuss Bennington's impact, commenting,

James Hingle echoed this sentiment, writing for Kerrang! he said that Bennington "was one of the most honest vocalists out there when it came to his mental health". In the same topic, William Goodman from Billboard said Bennington and fellow musicians Chris Cornell and Scott Weiland "helped define a generation of the hard rock sound, who were tied together artistically and personally".

The Straits Times music correspondent Eddino Abdul Hadi stated Bennington was an inspiration to many artists in the Singapore music scene. Calum Slingerland, editor of the Canadian periodical Exclaim!, expressed, "[H]is influence has been felt in the worlds of rock, metal, rap, and beyond".

After Bennington's death, his widow Talinda Bennington launched a campaign called 320 Changes Direction in honor of her husband to help break the stigma surrounding mental illness.

In 2020, during a Twitch live-stream, Mike Shinoda confirmed the existence of an unreleased Linkin Park song, titled "Friendly Fire", which features vocal tracks Bennington recorded during the One More Light sessions. At the time of his death, Bennington just finished a collaboration with Lamb of God guitarist Mark Morton for Morton's solo album Anesthetic entitled "Cross Off"; Morton later said in interviews that Bennington was "very, very excited about the idea of screaming and doing something heavier than what he's been doing lately". The music video for "Cross Off" later featured an empty microphone as a tribute to Bennington.

Discography

With Linkin Park

 Hybrid Theory (2000)
 Meteora (2003)
 Minutes to Midnight (2007)
 A Thousand Suns (2010)
 Living Things (2012)
 The Hunting Party (2014)
 One More Light (2017)

With Grey Daze

Singles

Music videos

With Dead by Sunrise
 Out of Ashes (2009)

With Stone Temple Pilots
 High Rise (2013)

Album contributions and singles

Music producer
Bennington executive-produced the 2012 debut EP Us–You for Los Angeles hard rock band Hellflower, which is fronted by his long-time friend and Director of Activities (D.O.A.) Church.

Filmography
Bennington made a cameo appearance in the 2006 film Crank as a customer in a pharmacy. He later appeared as a horse-track spectator in the film's 2009 sequel, Crank: High Voltage. Bennington also played the role of the ill-fated racist Evan in the 2010 film Saw 3D. He was one of several rock musicians who spoke about the industry on Jared Leto's 2012 documentary, Artifact.

Bennington was working with Church on developing an upcoming television show, Mayor of the World, with executive producer Trip Taylor.

References

External links

 
 
 Chester Bennington on Grammy Awards

1976 births
2017 deaths
2017 suicides
20th-century American singers
21st-century American singers
American male singers
American heavy metal singers
American tenors
Dead by Sunrise members
Grammy Award winners
Julien-K members
Linkin Park members
Musicians from Phoenix, Arizona
Nu metal singers
Singers from Arizona
Stone Temple Pilots members
Suicides by hanging in California
Singers with a three-octave vocal range